Fiddler's Green Amphitheatre  (formerly Comfort Dental Amphitheatre and Coors Amphitheatre) is an 18,000-person capacity amphitheatre located in Greenwood Village, Colorado, United States. It is the largest outdoor amphitheatre in the Denver metropolitan area and is generally open every year from May to September.

About
It features 7,500 fixed seats and a general admission lawn section. The amphitheatre is nestled in Greenwood Plaza near the Denver Technological Center amongst office buildings. It opened in 1988 under the original name of Fiddler's Green Amphitheatre with a performance by Dan Fogelberg on June 11, 1988. In March 2004, it was announced the amphitheatre would open the 2004 season with a new name, Coors Amphitheatre. The amphitheatre reclaimed its original name in 2009 when Coors sponsorship agreement with concert promoter Live Nation was not renewed, and Coors lost their naming rights. Starting February 2010, health organization Comfort Dental gained sponsorship rights for three years, changing its name to the Comfort Dental Amphitheatre. The contract expired on January 31, 2013, and was not renewed. Beginning February 2013, the venue is, once again, known by its original name. In October 2013, the venue's operations contract expired with Live Nation, with the entertainment company choosing not to renew. Its owner, The Museum of Outdoor Arts (MOA) signed a 15-year operations agreement with local promoter, AEG Live Rocky Mountains. The partnership will include a $5 million renovation, to take place during the amphitheatre's off season.

Museum of Outdoor Arts

The Museum of Outdoor Arts, a local non-profit, owns Fiddler's Green Amphitheatre and gave the venue its name when it originally opened. The amphitheatre began as an earth sculpture (made up only of earth and grass) where local business people could break for a lunchtime concert series sponsored by Museum of Outdoor Arts. Later, walls and seats were installed to make it the venue it is today. MOA has leased the venue out to large promoters such as MCA Concerts, House of Blues and Live Nation.

Also owned by MOA is Marjorie Park, which is connected to the amphitheatre.  Marjorie Park features outdoor sculptures owned by Museum of Outdoor Arts, including its famous bronze series of Alice in Wonderland by artist Harry Marinsky, Stickworks by internationally renowned artist Patrick Dougherty, kinetic sculpture Estacas by Ken Bortolazzo, African sculpture by Agnes Nyanhongo and also features seasonal installations by renowned Colorado-based artist Lonnie Hanzon.

Events

See also
List of contemporary amphitheatres
Red Rocks Amphitheatre

References

External links
Fiddler's Green Amphitheatre Official Site
Museum of Outdoor Arts
Light Rail and bus service to site. Walk from Arapahoe at Village Center Station.

Amphitheaters in the United States
Buildings and structures in Arapahoe County, Colorado
Greenwood Village, Colorado
Music venues in Colorado
Tourist attractions in Arapahoe County, Colorado